Dandi is a Local Government Area (LGA) in Kebbi State, Nigeria, sharing a boundary with the Republic of Niger. Its headquarters are in the town of Kamba. Dandi shares a southern border with Bunza LGA.

It has an area of 2,003 km and a population of 144,273 at the 2006 census.

The postal code of the area is 862.

References

Local Government Areas in Kebbi State